Grad is the surname of the following people:
Adam Grad (1969–2015), Polish association football player
Aleksander Grad (born 1962), Polish politician
Dagmara Grad (born 1990), Polish association football player
Harold Grad (1923–1986), American mathematician
Ilya Grad (born 1987), Israeli Muay Thai boxing champion
Zoltan Grad (1904–2003), Hungarian-American editor 
Gary L. Grad (1974-present) University of Mary Hall of Fame Football Player